Mario De Grassi (born January 22, 1919 in Livorno) was an Italian professional football player.

He played for 6 seasons (37 games, 3 goals) in the Serie A for A.S. Roma.

Honours
 Serie A champion: 1941/42.

External links
 Career summary by almanaccogiallorosso.it

1919 births
Year of death missing
Italian footballers
Serie A players
A.S. Roma players
Ternana Calcio players
A.C.N. Siena 1904 players
Association football midfielders